Bau (Amale) is a Papuan language of Papua New Guinea.

References

Gum languages
Languages of Madang Province